Belém Velho (meaning Old Bethlehem in Portuguese)  is a neighbourhood (bairro) in the city of Porto Alegre, the state capital of Rio Grande do Sul, in Brazil. It was created by Law 4876 from December 24, 1980.

Neighbourhoods in Porto Alegre